Rush Street may refer to

 Rush Street (album), a 1991 album by Richard Marx
 Rush Street, Chicago, Illinois, U.S.
 Rush Street Gaming, a casino company founded by Neil Bluhm and Greg Carlin which operates Rivers Casino

See also 
 "Rush Street Blues", a 1966 Waylon Jennings song from Nashville Rebel